Maz Abd Ali-ye Bala (also Romanized as Māz 'Abd 'Alī-ye Bālā; also known as Māz 'Abd ol 'Alī-ye Bālā and Māzbadālī) is a village in Anaran Rural District, in the Central District of Dehloran County, Ilam Province, Iran. At the 2006 census, its population was 114, in 17 families. The village is populated by Lurs.

References 

Populated places in Dehloran County
Luri settlements in Ilam Province